The Rogues of London is a 1915 British silent thriller film directed by Bert Haldane and starring Blanche Forsythe, Fred Paul and Maud Yates.

Cast
 Blanche Forsythe as Ruth Davies 
 Fred Paul as Ralph Munt 
 Maud Yates as Vera Verez  
 Roy Travers

References

Bibliography

External links

1915 films
1910s thriller films
British silent feature films
British thriller films
Films set in London
Films directed by Bert Haldane
British black-and-white films
1910s English-language films
1910s British films
Silent thriller films